FedEx Express Flight 1478 was a scheduled domestic cargo flight from Memphis International Airport to Tallahassee International Airport. On July 26, 2002, the Boeing 727-232F aircraft flying this route crashed during landing at Tallahassee. All three flight crew members survived the accident with serious injuries, but the aircraft was destroyed.

Aircraft and crew 

The aircraft involved was a Boeing 727-232 freighter registered as N497FE (serial number 20866 - line number 1067), that had its first flight on September 3, 1974. The aircraft was delivered to Delta Air Lines on September 13, 1986, and it was transferred to FedEx on December 2 of the same year. It was then transferred to TAP Air Portugal which leased it to Air Atlantis. In December 1987 the aircraft was subleased to Gulf Air Transport. The aircraft was later returned to FedEx and on December 13, 1989, it was converted into a freighter.

The three flight crew members were the aircraft's only occupants. The captain was 55-year-old William Walsh who had been with FedEx Express since 1989 and had a total of 13,000 to 14,000 hours of flight experience, including 2,754 hours on the Boeing 727. His latest medical certificate issued by the Federal Aviation Administration (FAA) required him to wear corrective lenses in flight.

The first officer was 44-year-old William Frye, who had been with FedEx Express since 1997, having previously served as a United States Navy pilot for 16 years. He had 8,500 flight hours, with 1,983 of them on the Boeing 727. According to his recent medical certificate, Frye was color blind but passed the Navy's color vision tests a total of 13 times.

The flight engineer was 33-year-old David Mendez, who had been with FedEx Express for less than a year and had 2,600 flight hours, including 346 hours on the Boeing 727.

Accident 
Flight 1478 departed at 4:12 AM EDT, with first officer Frye as the pilot flying. The flight was initially intending to land on runway 27 due to wind gusts. However, after receiving a weather update at 5:24, the flight crew changed to a straight-in visual approach to Runway 09. Since the air traffic control (ATC) tower at Tallahassee did not open until 6:00, Flight 1478 was monitored by air traffic controllers in Jacksonville. 

At 5:30, first officer Frye said, "okay, I think I got a runway now." The flight crew then discussed the runway and the position of the aircraft. At this time the precision approach path indicator (PAPI) lights displayed one red light and three white lights. At the same time the ground proximity warning system (GPWS) sounded a "five hundred" feet above ground level warning. Captain Walsh responded, "stable" while first officer Frye said "gonna have to stay just a little bit higher... I'm gonna lose the end of the runway." At 5:37, with the landing gear lowered and the flaps at 30 degrees, the aircraft impacted -high trees located  short of the runway. Tallahassee International Airport was closed until 10:35.

Investigation 
The National Transportation Safety Board (NTSB) conducted an investigation into the accident, determining that the cause of the accident was the flight crew's failure to maintain an appropriate flight path during a visual approach at night. The flight crew were also fatigued and did not adhere to standard operating procedures (SOP).

The flight crew testified the approach was normal until the last moment, and none of the crew verbalized that all four PAPIs were red. First officer Frye also underwent an eye test after the accident, revealing that it was difficult for him to distinguish between red, green and white. The NTSB concluded that based on the results this made it difficult for Frye to distinguish between the color of the PAPI lights.

See also 
 American Airlines Flight 965
 Corporate Airlines Flight 5966
 Korean Air Flight 801

References

External links 

National Transportation Safety Board
Docket including Air Traffic Control transmission transcript, Cockpit Voice Recorder transcript, Flight Data Recorder readout, List of FDR parameters, FDR data plots.

July 2002 events in the United States
Tallahassee, Florida
Transportation disasters in Florida
Airliner accidents and incidents caused by pilot error
2002 in the United States
Accidents and incidents involving the Boeing 727
Airliner accidents and incidents in the United States
FedEx Express accidents and incidents
Aviation accidents and incidents in 2002
Airliner accidents and incidents involving controlled flight into terrain